The Attica Project is an unregistered political party in New Zealand.

The party was founded by Mike Iles and Michael Kay, who left the New Zealand Outdoors Party over frustrations with its organisation and processes. Iles and Kay have said they intend to run the party as a largely leaderless movement. The party opposes neoliberal policies. Its website presents policies relating to improved conservation, water and soil among others.

Attica was not registered for the 2020 general election, so could not receive party votes. It ran two candidates in electorates: Mike Iles in Mana and Michael Kay in Ōtaki. Iles received 64 votes and Kay received 241.

References

External links
 

Political parties in New Zealand
Political parties established in 2020
2020 establishments in New Zealand